Juan Carlos Colombo (born 7 November 1950 in San Juan, Argentina) is an Argentine–Mexican actor. He has resided in Mexico since 1975, where he studied acting and met his wife, actress Patricia Eguía. Colombo is the father of the Argentine-Mexican actor and musician Felipe Colombo. In 2017, he received the "Virginia Fábregas" medal from the National Association of Actors for his 25-year artistic career in Mexico. Colombo is mostly known for his roles in television, particularly in Televisa's telenovelas, among which are: Teresa (2010), Cachito de cielo (2012), and Yo no creo en los hombres (2014).

Filmography

Selected film roles

Television roles

Awards and nominations

References

External links 
 

1950 births
Living people
Mexican male film actors
Mexican male telenovela actors
People from San Juan, Argentina
20th-century Mexican male actors
21st-century Mexican male actors
Argentine male actors
Argentine male film actors
Argentine male telenovela actors
Expatriate actors in Mexico